The Journal of Legal Analysis is a peer-reviewed open access law journal that was established in 2009. It is published by Oxford University Press on behalf of the Harvard Law School and covers all aspects of law. The editors-in-chief are Oren Bar-Gill (Harvard University) and Daryl Levinson (New York University).

Abstracting and indexing
The journal is abstracted and indexed in:
Current Contents/Social and Behavioral Sciences
EBSCO databases
HeinOnline
Scopus
Social Sciences Citation Index
According to the Journal Citation Reports, the journal has a 2020 impact factor of 2.750.

References

External links

Open access journals
Law journals
Oxford University Press academic journals
English-language journals
Publications established in 2009